Damir Sadiković (born 7 April 1995) is a Bosnian professional footballer who plays as a midfielder. Born in Germany, he represents the Bosnia and Herzegovina national team.

Club career

Early career
Sadiković began his football career at Radnik Hadžići, before leaving for Željezničar in August 2012 where he joined the youth team.

Željezničar
While Sadiković was still a part of the Željezničar youth team, he was called up to the first team in January 2013. That year in May, he won the 2012–13 Bosnian Premier League.

Sadiković made 64 league appearances and scored 6 goals during his period playing for Željezničar.

Loan to Krško
While at Željezničar, Sadiković was loaned out to Krško for the 2016–17 Slovenian PrvaLiga season.

Leaving Željezničar
After his loan ended, Sadiković went back to Željezničar, but shortly after left the club. He was one of the most technically gifted players at Željezničar at the time.

Mladost Doboj Kakanj
On 25 September 2017, Sadiković signed a one-year deal contract with the possibility of an extension for one more year with Mladost Doboj Kakanj. He left Mladost on 14 February 2019 so that he could join Željezničar.

Return to Željezničar
On 15 February 2019, one day after leaving Mladost, Sadiković returned and signed a one-and-a-half year contract, with a possibility of an extension for one more year with Željezničar.

Sadiković made his first appearance since returning to Željezničar on 24 February 2019, in a 1–0 loss to Radnik Bijeljina, coming in as an 82nd-minute substitute for Haris Hajdarević. He scored his first goal in his second spell with the club on 20 April 2019 in a 3–0 home win against Krupa.

On 10 August 2019, he made his 100th appearance for Željezničar in a 2–0 away league win against Čelik Zenica, in which he made an assist and was one of the best players of the game.

Cracovia
On 5 October 2020, Sadiković signed a three-year contract with Polish Ekstraklasa club Cracovia for a €200.000 transfer fee. He made his debut for Cracovia in the 2020 Polish Super Cup triumph against Legia Warsaw on 9 October 2020. On 14 July 2022, after not making an appearance since November 2021, he left the club by mutual consent.

International career
Sadiković has represented Bosnia and Herzegovina at under-19 and under-21 levels. He made six appearances for both selections respectively between 2013 and 2016. He made his debut for the senior Bosnia and Herzegovina national team in a friendly 0–0 tie with Montenegro on 2 June 2021.

Career statistics

Club

Honours
Željezničar
Bosnian Premier League: 2012–13

Cracovia
Polish Super Cup: 2020

References

External links
Damir Sadiković at Sofascore

1995 births
Living people
Footballers from Cologne
Citizens of Bosnia and Herzegovina through descent
Bosnia and Herzegovina footballers
Bosnia and Herzegovina youth international footballers
Bosnia and Herzegovina under-21 international footballers
Bosnia and Herzegovina international footballers
German footballers
German people of Bosnia and Herzegovina descent
Association football midfielders
FK Željezničar Sarajevo players
NK Krško players
FK Mladost Doboj Kakanj players
MKS Cracovia (football) players
Premier League of Bosnia and Herzegovina players
Slovenian PrvaLiga players
Ekstraklasa players
III liga players
Bosnia and Herzegovina expatriate footballers
Expatriate footballers in Slovenia
Expatriate footballers in Poland
Bosnia and Herzegovina expatriate sportspeople in Slovenia
Bosnia and Herzegovina expatriate sportspeople in Poland